This article lists the winners and nominees for the NAACP Image Award for Outstanding Song. The award was first given in 1972, before being retired until the 1996 ceremony. In 2017 the category was divided, honoring traditional and contemporary songs separately. Since its conception, Alicia Keys holds the record for most wins in this category with five.

Winners and nominees
Winners are listed first and highlighted in bold.

1970s

1990s

2000s

2010s

2020s

Multiple wins and nominations

Wins

 5 wins
 Alicia Keys
 3 wins
 Beyoncé

 2 wins
 Kirk Franklin
 Whitney Houston
 Kendrick Lamar
 R. Kelly

Nominations

 10 nominations
 Alicia Keys

 9 nominations
 Beyoncé

 5 nominations
 Kirk Franklin
 John Legend
 Bruno Mars
 Maxwell

 4 nominations
 India Arie
 Mary J. Blige

 3 nominations
 Erykah Badu
 Common
 Whitney Houston

 Kem
 Kendrick Lamar
 Jill Scott

 2 nominations
 Fantasia
 CeeLo Green
 Anthony Hamilton
 H.E.R.
 Lauryn Hill
 R. Kelly
 Lizzo
 MAJOR.
 Jazmine Sullivan
 Usher
 Kanye West
 Pharrell Williams

References

NAACP Image Awards
Song awards